Noorpur Thal Tehsil  (Punjabi : تحصیل نُور پُور تھل), is a Tehsil an administrative subdivision of Khushab District in the Punjab province of Pakistan. The city of Noorpur Thal is the headquarters of the tehsil which is administratively subdivided into 10 Union Councils. It comprises a major part of the Thal desert.

The majority religion is Islam, while the main language is Punjabi, native to 94.6% of the population.

History
Noorpur Thal Tehsil was an agricultural region with forests during the Indus Valley civilization. The Vedic period is characterized by Indo-Aryan culture that invaded from Central Asia and settled in Punjab region. The Kambojas, Daradas, Kaikayas, Madras, Pauravas, Yaudheyas, Malavas, Saindhavas and Kurus invaded, settled and ruled ancient Punjab region. After overrunning the Achaemenid Empire in 331 BCE, Alexander marched into present-day Punjab region with an army of 50,000. The Khushab was ruled by Maurya Empire, Indo-Greek kingdom, Kushan Empire, Gupta Empire, White Huns, Kushano-Hephthalites and the Turk and Hindu Shahi kingdoms.

In 997 CE, Sultan Mahmud Ghaznavi, took over the Ghaznavid dynasty empire established by his father, Sultan Sebuktegin. In 1005 he conquered the Shahis in Kabul in 1005, and followed it by the conquests of Punjab region. The Delhi Sultanate and later Mughal Empire ruled the region.

Syed Noor Hassan Shah (ra) was a preacher of Islam. While He was traveling for preach, He reached to a point in desert where there was a “Toba” (means rain water). There was also grass near that water. It was so beautiful as finding water in desert was impossible. He stayed there with his family and his “Mureed’s) followers. The place named after him, and it’s called Noor Pur. Now  its called Noor Pur Thal.

The Punjab region became predominantly Muslim due to missionary Sufi saints whose dargahs dot the landscape of Punjab region.

After the decline of the Mughal Empire, the Sikh Empire invaded and occupied Khushab Tehsil. Before 1947 Sardar Jawahar singh was Zaildar of village noorpur thal Tehsil Khushab, District sarghoda . After 1947 Zaildar Sardar Jawahar singh moved to(new)India and settled in village Sadhora , District Ambala and he died in Civil Hospital Ambala. During the period of British rule, Noorpur Thal Tehsil increased in population and importance. During British rule the road and railway networks were built to connect Noorpur Tehsil with the rest of Punjab region.

The predominantly Muslim population supported Muslim League and Pakistan Movement.  After the independence of Pakistan in 1947, the minority Hindus and Sikhs migrated to India while the Muslim refugees from India settled in the Noorpur Thal Tehsil. Noorpur Thal was named tehsil in 1982 by (MALIK HAJI AFZAL BAGHOOR)when Khushab was given the status of district.

Union Councils
Noorpur Thal is subdivided into 11 Union Councils.

  Adhi Kot
  Jamali Noorpur
  Jaura Kalan
  Bourana
  Jharkal
  Khai Khurd

  Khatwan Balouch
  Noorpur Thal
  Pelowaince
  Dhamak
  Rangpur

 Biland

See also
Jamali Balochan

References

 khatwan

Tehsils of Punjab, Pakistan
Khushab District